The 1980 Cal State Northridge  Matadors football team represented California State University, Northridge as a member of the California Collegiate Athletic Association (CCAA) during the 1980 NCAA Division II football season. Led by second-year head coach Tom Keele, Cal State Northridge compiled an overall record of 5–6 with a mark of 1–1 in conference play, placing second in the CCAA. The team was outscored by its opponents 263 to 188 for the season. The Matadors played home games at North Campus Stadium in Northridge, California.

Schedule

Team players in the NFL
No Cal State Northridge players were selected in the 1981 NFL Draft.

The following finished their college career in 1980, were not drafted, but played in the NFL.

References

Cal State Northridge
Cal State Northridge Matadors football seasons
Cal State Northridge Matadors football